The Beveridge Group is a centre-left group within the Liberal Democrat party in the UK. It was set up in 2001 by MPs Alistair Carmichael, Paul Holmes, John Barrett and John Pugh to promote debate within the party regarding public service provision.

The group was set up largely in response to a perceived rightwards drift in Liberal Democrat thinking, typified by the economic liberalism of  Lib Dem economic spokesman Vince Cable and former Home Affairs spokesman Mark Oaten.

In its first article, written by Alistair Carmichael in 2003, the group questioned the claim in the Liberal Democrat policy paper Setting Business Free that the party should "start with a bias in favour of market solutions". Responding to this argument, the paper asked: "should the party of Beveridge and Keynes approach issues with a prejudice in favour of the free market system? Should we enter every policy debate with an underlying belief that private is always better than public? I certainly do not think so. That was the approach which led the Conservatives to undertake the disastrous privatisation of British Rail in the mid 1990s."

The role of the Beveridge Group has been brought into focus with the rise of Nick Clegg, another leading market liberal and Orange Book contributor, to the leadership of the party in 2007, and more so after his decision to lead the Liberal Democrats into a Coalition government with the Conservatives following the hung parliament result in the May 2010 general election. It has been noted that along with Clegg (deputy Prime Minister up to the 2015 elections) MPs who contributed to the Orange Book or are otherwise associated with the market liberal faction occupied many positions in the Coalition Cabinet during the Liberal Democrats time in office, including Vince Cable (Business Secretary), David Laws (briefly Chief Secretary to the Treasury) and Danny Alexander (Chief Secretary to the Treasury), with others such as Ed Davey and Steve Webb holding ministerial posts, while it has been speculated that the more socially liberal Beveridge Group members were under-represented in the Cabinet, perhaps signalling a 'takeover' of the Liberal Democrats by the so-called Orange Bookers.

However, Beveridge Group members Norman Baker and Alistair Carmichael each held ministerial ranks in the government, as Parliamentary Under-Secretary for Transport and Chief Deputy Whip for the Liberal Democrats in the government respectively, with Mark Hunter assigned as an Assistant Whip. Furthermore, in 2010 Group members Simon Hughes and Tim Farron were elected Deputy Party Leader and Party President, respectively. After the 2015 general election, Farron won the Liberal Democrat leadership election, beating his rival, Norman Lamb.

On 18 December 2013, Simon Hughes was appointed Minister of State at the Ministry of Justice.

Membership 
As of May 2017, there was a membership of 30 current, or former, MPs:

Sitting MPs (2)
Alistair Carmichael MP
Tim Farron MP and Former Leader

Former MPs (28)
Sandra Gidley
Paul Holmes
David Howarth
Chris Huhne Former Secretary of State for Energy and Climate Change
Paul Keetch
Paul Rowen
Phil Willis
Richard Younger-Ross
Evan Harris
John Barrett
Norman Baker
Annette Brooke
Don Foster
Andrew George
Mike Hancock
John Hemming
Martin Horwood
Simon Hughes Former Deputy Leader of the Liberal Democrats
John Pugh
Dan Rogerson
Bob Russell
Adrian Sanders
Mark Williams 
Roger Williams
Stephen Williams
Jenny Willott
Mark Hunter
John Leech

See also 
William Beveridge
John Maynard Keynes
Liberal Democrat Federal Conference
Liberal Reform
Social Democratic Party
Social Liberal Forum
Social liberalism
Social market economy
Welfare state

References

Liberal Democrat (UK) factions
Organisations associated with the Liberal Democrats (UK)
Political party factions in the United Kingdom
Groups of British MPs
2001 establishments in the United Kingdom